Antonio Quijarro is a province in the central parts of the Bolivian Potosí Department situated at the Salar de Uyuni. Its seat is Uyuni.

Location
Antonio Quijarro province is one of sixteen provinces in the Potosí Department. It is located between 19° 21' and 20° 59' South and between 65° 46' and 67° 15' West.

It borders Oruro Department in the north, Nor Lípez Province in the west, Sud Chichas Province in the southeast, Nor Chichas Province and José María Linares Province in the east, and Tomás Frías Province in the northeast.

The province extends over 180 km from east to west and 225 km from north to south.

Geography
The province lies at the Uyuni salt flat.

Some of the highest mountains of the province are listed below:

Division
The province comprises three municipalities which are partly further subdivided into cantons.

Population
The main language of the province is Spanish, spoken by 87%, while 74% of the population speak Quechua. The population increased from 37,384 inhabitants (1992 census) to 37,428 (2001 census), an increase of only 0.1%. Capital of the province is Uyuni (10,191 inhabitants).

53% of the population have no access to electricity, 85% have no sanitary facilities. 50% of the population are employed in agriculture, 8% in mining, 5% in industry, 37% in general services. 86% of the population are Catholics, 11% Protestants.

The people are predominantly indigenous citizens of Quechua and Aymara descent.

See also 
 Warawara Lake

References 

Population data (Spanish)

Provinces of Potosí Department